The plush-coated ringtail possum or golden ringtail possum (Pseudochirops corinnae) is a species of marsupial in the family Pseudocheiridae. It is found in Indonesia, Papua New Guinea, and the Solomon Islands. Its natural habitat is subtropical or tropical dry forests.

Names
It is known as wcm, pungi-mdep, wlpog in the Kalam language of Papua New Guinea.

References

Possums
Mammals described in 1897
Taxa named by Oldfield Thomas
Taxonomy articles created by Polbot
Marsupials of New Guinea